Theodore Rothstein (Fyodor Aronovich Rotshteyn; 14 February 1871  30 August 1953) was a Soviet politician, journalist, writer and communist. He served as a Soviet ambassador in the 1920s.

Life 
Theodore Rothstein was born in 1871 in the Imperial Russian city of Kovno, Kovno Governorate (present-day Kaunas, Lithuania), into a Jewish family.

Rothstein left Russia in 1890 for political reasons and settled in the United Kingdom. He worked as a journalist in the area of foreign policy for The Tribune, the Daily News,  The Manchester Guardian, and became a member of the National Union of Journalists. Furthermore, he was active in London as a correspondent for several radical Russian newspapers. Rothstein also wrote articles for Die Neue Zeit, the organ of the Social Democratic Party of Germany (SPD), which represented the direct way of a consistent Marxism and in which took place debates regarding Marxism and socialism.

In 1895, he joined the Social Democratic Federation (SDF) which was founded by H.M. Hyndman in 1884. Rothstein occupied the left-wing of the party as a prominent theorist and forward thinker, and in 1900 he was elected to its executive. He also joined the Russian Social Democratic and Labour Party as a British member in 1901, siding with the Bolshevik faction against the Mensheviks and becoming a close comrade of Lenin, who often stayed at Rothstein's house on Clapton Square in the Hackney area of London.

Rothstein published Egypt's Ruin in 1910, a work which argued that Egypt was being exploited under British rule. He used British government documents and correspondent reports from London newspapers regarding Egypt to bolster his arguments. Although Rothstein was a convinced opponent of World War I, he worked for the Foreign Office and the War Office as a Russian translator and interpreter.

Within the SDF's successor, the British Socialist Party (BSP), he was a leader of the opposition to Hyndman's support for the war. After Hyndman and his supporters left the BSP, Rothstein made numerous contributions to their paper, The Call. He played a leading role in ensuring that the BSP played a significant role in the formation of the Communist Party of Great Britain. However, following an invitation to Moscow in 1920, he was refused permission to return to Britain. He remained in Russia, became a member of the Bolshevik Party, took on the chairmanship of the "University reform commission" (1920–1921).

Soviet Ambassador to Iran
On 6 January 1921 Rothstein was accredited as the first Soviet Ambassador to Tehran and departed for the posting on 6 February after having had a discussion with Lenin. He took with him an abnormally large entourage of 150 people.

Later career
From 1922 on he was a member of the "Collegium of the People's Commissariat for Foreign Affairs". Rothstein was appointed director of the Institute of World Economy and Politics in Moscow.

Rothstein's son, Andrew, remained in Britain and became a prominent communist.

Rothstein died in Moscow in 1953.

References

Works 
 The Decline of British Industry, 1903.
 The Russian Revolution, 1907.
 Egypt’s Ruin, A Financial and Administrative Record, London, 1910.
 Essays in the History of the British Labour Movement.
 From Chartism to Labourism - Historical Sketches of the English Working Class Movement, Dorrot Press Ltd., London, 1929.

Sources 
 Theodore Rothstein, From Chartism to Labourism - Historical Sketches of the English Working Class Movement, Dorrot Press Ltd., London, 1929.
 Theodore Rothstein biography - Marxists Internet Archive
 Compendium of Communist Biography by surname - Graham Stevenson, National Organiser for the Transport and General Workers Union

External links 
 Theodore Rothstein at the Marxists Internet Archive
 Theodore Rothstein - Russian article about Rothstein with his photo

1871 births
1953 deaths
Ambassadors of the Soviet Union to Iran
British political writers
British Socialist Party members
Communist Party of Great Britain members
Communist Party of the Soviet Union members
Lithuanian communists
Jewish socialists
Lithuanian Jews
Marxist writers
Old Bolsheviks
Russian Social Democratic Labour Party members
Social Democratic Federation members
Full Members of the USSR Academy of Sciences
Jewish Soviet politicians
Writers from Kaunas
People from Kovensky Uyezd
British emigrants to the Soviet Union
Diplomats from Kaunas
Emigrants from the Russian Empire to the United Kingdom